This is a list of American Civil War monuments in Kentucky — Union, Confederate or both. The earliest Confederate memorials were, in general, simple memorials. The earliest such monument was the Confederate Monument in Cynthiana erected in 1869. Later monuments were more elaborate. In the late 19th century, Confederate monuments increasingly were focused on a "memorialization of the Lost Cause" and a "celebration of the Confederacy".

In 1997, 61 properties were added to the National Register of Historic Places as a result of a Multiple Property Submission (MPS). Two prominent monuments were not included in that MPS because they were already listed on the National Register. Although Kentucky produced more Union troops than Confederate troops (125,000 compared to 35,000), most of the monuments included in the MPS were dedicated to Confederate forces.

List of American Civil War monuments in Kentucky

References

External links
 National Register of Historic Places Weekly List of Actions Taken on Properties 7/14/97 through 7/18/97
 The Civil War in Kentucky, TrailsRUs.com website